Hafiz Ahmad Khan Mosque is a mosque situated in the neighbourhood of Chepauk in Chennai, India. The mosque was constructed in 1818 by Hafiz Ahmad Khan, a Carnatic court official and younger brother of Bahram Jung who constructed the Bahram Jung Mosque.  The mosque is situated next to Vivekanandar Illam.

References 

 

Mosques in Chennai
Religious buildings and structures completed in 1818